Andreas Maurer and Jörgen Windahl were the defending champions, but did not participate this year.

Ricardo Acioly and Luiz Mattar won the title, defeating Mansour Bahrami and Diego Pérez 3–6, 6–4, 6–2 in the final.

Seeds

  Hans Gildemeister /  Andrés Gómez (semifinals)
  Claudio Mezzadri /  Tomáš Šmíd (semifinals)
  Mansour Bahrami /  Diego Pérez (final)
  Ronnie Båthman /  Joakim Nyström (quarterfinals)

Draw

Draw

References
Draw

1987 in Swiss sport
1987 Grand Prix (tennis)
1987 Geneva Open